Pterostylis caulescens is a plant in the orchid family Orchidaceae and is endemic to New Guinea. It was first formally described in 1946 by Louis Otho Williams from a specimen collected in the Rawlinson Range by Mary Strong Clemens. The description was published in the Harvard University Botanical Museum Leaflets. He also noted that he was describing the plant from poor material but that the colour of the flower was "flesh pink". The specific epithet (caulescens) is derived from the Latin word caulis meaning "a stem", hence caulescent.

References

caulescens
Orchids of New Guinea
Plants described in 1946
Endemic flora of New Guinea